Bruravik is a ferry quay in the municipality of Ulvik in Vestland county, Norway.

There was formerly a ferry connection from Bruravik to Brimnes in the municipality of Eidfjord. The ferry quay was equipped with waiting rooms, benches, and restrooms. The ferry service was discontinued after the construction of the Hardanger Bridge.

References

Ferry quays in Vestland
Ulvik